The 1988 Champions Trophy was held in Sharjah, UAE, between October 16–22, 1988. Three national teams took part: India, Pakistan and West Indies.

The 1988 Champions Trophy started with a round-robin tournament where each team played the other once. The leading team qualified for the final in a knock-out tournament while the second and third-placed team contested a semi-final for the right to contest the final.

West Indies won the tournament and US$30,000 (£17,250) in prize money. Pakistan, the runners-up, received $US20,000 (£11,500) and India $US15,000 (£8,625).

The main beneficiaries of the tournament were Mohsin Khan and Ravi Shastri who received US$50,000 (£28.750). The minor beneficiaries were Munir Malik and Bhagwat Chandrasekhar who received US$15,000 (£8,625).

Matches

Group stage

Semi-final

Final

See also
 Sharjah Cup

References

 
 Cricket Archive: Champions Trophy 1988/89
 ESPNCricinfo: Champions Trophy, 1988/89
 

International cricket competitions from 1988–89 to 1991
Champions Trophy, 1988
1988 in Emirati sport
International cricket competitions in the United Arab Emirates